Peter-No-Tail is a 1981 Swedish animated film based on the children's book series by Gösta Knutsson.

Plot 

On a Swedish country farm, a cat gives birth to a litter of kittens, one of which does not have a tail. The kindly farmer is ordered by the farm's cruel owner to get rid of the tail-less kitten, so he smuggles the young cat into the car of a family returning to Uppsala after their summer holiday near the farm. Discovered on arrival at the family's home, the stowaway is named Peter-No-Tail (Pelle Svanslös) by the children Olle and Birgitta.

Peter soon settles into his new home, but when Birgitta takes him out for a walk in the following spring, he is chased by a vicious bulldog, and escapes to a town alley where Elaka Måns (Mean Mike) lives. The long-tailed Måns, aided by twins Bill and Bull, is a notorious bully amongst the town cats, so he tricks the naïve Peter into singing outside the home of a young female cat named Maja Gräddnos (Molly Cream-Nose). Maja's human owners hate cat howling, so Måns expects Peter to be soaked with water in his attempt to impress Maja. But Maja is attracted to the polite and kind-hearted Peter, so she invites him in to share some fish with her; thus it is Måns who ends up getting soaked with a garden hose when he tries to impress Maja himself.

At the town cats' spring ball, Måns organises a competition where contestants must answer a mental arithmetic question by showing the winning number with their tails. Peter is given an impossibly hard sum, and the other cats mock him for not having a tail at all to even guess the answer. But a snake that Peter befriended earlier reveals the correct answer, and also bites Måns' long tail, humiliating him in front of the crowd. In revenge, Måns breaks into Peter's home and frames him for eating Olle's birthday cake, so the family locks Peter in the ironing room as punishment. However, when a fire breaks out in the house at night, Peter wakes and alerts the sleeping family with his frantic meowing, so he is redeemed as a hero, and Birgitta gives him a medal for his bravery.

When Måns learns of Peter's good deed, he dismisses his medal as worthless, and invents a new sports event called the Cat Championship, where the winning prize is a gold medallion. The challenges include a distance jump, throwing shotput balls, and a hurdle race course. Måns stages each of the challenges so that Peter fails - his spike shoes for the distance jump have the spikes on the inside to hurt his feet, Peter's shotput ball is far heavier than the others, and Måns cheats in the hurdle race to make sure he wins. But when Måns' tricks are discovered, the referee disqualifies him and awards Peter the gold medallion instead. Maja, who has been cheering Peter on throughout the tournament, congratulates him and they celebrate his victory together.

Now eager to get rid of Peter, Måns tries to rally his fellow cats into opposing 'country' cats, and he sets loose the dangerous bulldog to chase Peter out of the city. Most of the town cats watch from safety in the trees, but a kitten named Fridolf has strayed onto some high scaffolding platforms, where he is attacked by the bulldog. Peter rescues Fridolf from the collapsing scaffolding and escapes from the savage bulldog, who subsequently chases Måns, Bill and Bull away instead. For saving Fridolf, the town cats praise Peter and finally accept him into their community. At the end of the film, Peter's family take him with them on their next summer holiday, returning to the farm where Peter was born.

Origins
The film is animated and is based on the children's book series by Gösta Knutsson. Class discrimination, bullying and racism play a big part of the story, much like in the books since Peter is at times looked down on for being a "country cat", who is accused by Måns of threatening the livelihoods of the town cats. In the original Swedish dub Måns is played by Ernst-Hugo Järegård.

Cast

Additional American Voices
Richard Kline (Monty, Ernest, Lambert)
William Schallert

Sequel
A sequel called Peter-No-Tail in Americat was released in 1985.

Reception

References

External links 
 
 
 

Films based on Swedish novels
Swedish children's films
Swedish animated films
1981 animated films
1981 films
Animated films about cats
Films set in Uppsala
Atlantic Entertainment Group films
1980s children's animated films
1980s Swedish films